Miami is a 2017 Finnish drama film directed by Zaida Bergroth. It was screened in the Contemporary World Cinema section at the 2017 Toronto International Film Festival.

Cast
 Krista Kosonen as Angela
  as Anna
 Alex Anton as Timi
 Juhan Ulfsak as Eduard
 Janne Reinikainen as Jouni

References

External links
 

2017 films
2017 drama films
Finnish drama films
2010s Finnish-language films